Callan Hayden Foote (born December 13, 1998) is an American-born Canadian professional ice hockey defenceman for the Nashville Predators of the National Hockey League (NHL). Foote was selected 14th overall in the 2017 NHL Entry Draft by the Tampa Bay Lightning. Foote won the Stanley Cup with the Lightning in 2021.

Playing career

Junior
Foote was drafted in the second-round by the Kelowna Rockets of the Western Hockey League (WHL) in the 2013 WHL bantam draft. After being drafted by Kelowna, Foote played two seasons with the Colorado Thunderbirds under-16 team in the Tier 1 Elite Hockey League before making his WHL debut in the 2015–16 season. In his draft year, Foote posted 57 points in 71 games for the Kelowna Rockets. On June 23, 2017, the Tampa Bay Lightning selected Foote in the first round of the 2017 NHL Entry Draft with the 14th overall pick. Foote was the eighth Kelowna Rockets player in team history to be drafted in the first round.

On September 22, 2017, Foote was named as the 23rd captain in the Kelowna Rockets history. On April 1, 2018, Foote was signed to a three-year, entry-level contract by the Tampa Bay Lightning.

Professional
After signing his entry-level contract, Foote joined the Syracuse Crunch of the American Hockey League (AHL), which is the affiliate of the Lightning. On April 6, 2018, Foote made his professional ice hockey debut in a 4–3 Crunch shootout loss to the Binghamton Devils. Foote scored the first goal of the game on his first shot.

In his first full professional season, Foote scored 10 goals and 21 assists, for a total of 31 points. In four games in the 2019 Calder Cup playoffs, he went scoreless.

Foote was one of the eight players called up to the Lightning for their training camp prior to the 2020 Stanley Cup playoffs.

In the 2020–21 season, on January 13, 2021, Foote made his NHL debut in a 5–1 Lightning win in the season opener against the Chicago Blackhawks. On January 30, Foote scored his first NHL goal and point against Pekka Rinne of the Nashville Predators. On March 25, Foote recorded his first career NHL assist.

During his third season with the Lightning, his first full-time season in the NHL in 2022–23, Foote added one goal and two assists through 26 regular season games before he was traded by Tampa Bay, along with five future draft picks, to the Nashville Predators in exchange for Tanner Jeannot on February 26, 2023.

International play

On December 6, 2017, Foote was named to Canada national junior team's selection camp roster for the 2018 World Junior Ice Hockey Championships. On January 5, 2018, Foote won a gold medal with Canada national junior team.

Personal life
Foote is the son of former NHL defenceman Adam Foote. He was drafted eight picks higher than his father was in 1989, when his father was drafted 22nd overall by the Quebec Nordiques.

Foote's younger brother Nolan was his teammate when he played in Kelowna. He was drafted 27th overall in the 2019 NHL Entry Draft by the Tampa Bay Lightning. He is now a member of the New Jersey Devils organization.

Career statistics

Regular Season and Playoffs

International

References

External links
 

1998 births
Living people
American men's ice hockey defensemen
Canadian ice hockey defencemen
Ice hockey players from Colorado
Kelowna Rockets players
Nashville Predators players
National Hockey League first-round draft picks
Omaha Lancers players
People from Englewood, Colorado
Stanley Cup champions
Syracuse Crunch players
Tampa Bay Lightning draft picks
Tampa Bay Lightning players